HMS Saint Lucia was a brig-sloop, the former French Navy schooner Enfant Prodigue, which the British captured in 1803 and took into service with the Royal Navy. Under the British flag she captured three small French privateers and several prizes in the Leeward Islands before two French privateers recaptured her in 1807.

French Navy schooner
Enfant Prodigue was a schooner, built in America in 1790 and coppered in December 1790 at Lorient. The French Navy purchased her at Bordeaux in 1796. The French Navy commissioned her as an aviso under Lieutenant Pierre Guiyesse. From 1 February 1798 to 7 March 1798, she ferried passengers from Cap-Français to A Coruña, and later from Ferrol to Lorient. In 1799 she captured the British schooner  in a fight that resulted in Charlotte having one man wounded.

Capture
On 24 June 1803,  captured Enfant Prodigue between St Lucia and Martinique after a chase of 72 hours. Captain James O'Bryen of Emerald reported that Enfant Prodigue was pierced for 16 guns but during the chase had thrown all of her guns, however many she actually mounted, overboard. Head money was paid 25 years later.

The British took Enfant Prodigue into service as the brig-sloop HMS Saint Lucia, of 14 guns. She was commissioned in August under Commander Conway Shipley.

British warship
On 16 August 1803, Saint Lucia captured the French privateer Sally. Sally was armed with six guns and had a crew of 28 men.

In August–September Saint Lucia captured three  prizes:
French sloop Eliza (1 August), carrying mahogany and mill timber;
brig Lucretia (16 September), carrying sugar; and,
schooner Diana (27 September), carrying coffee and sugar.

Around November, Saint Lucia recaptured the brig Earl St. Vincent, which had been sailing from Dublin to Barbados, and a Swedish schooner. The French privateer Harmonie, of Martinique, had captured them three days earlier. Saint Lucia was unable to capture the privateer which escaped by throwing her guns overboard and sawing down her gunwales.

On 25 January 1804, Saint Lucia captured the French privateers Furet and Bijou. Furet was out of Guadeloupe. She was armed with four guns and had a crew of 45 men. Bijou, which Saint Lucia captured off Grenada, was armed with six guns, and had a crew of 60 men, twenty of whom she had put on two prizes. The two prizes were the brig Good Intent, which had been sailing from Barbados to Demarara, and which  had since retaken, and the schooner Fancy, which had been sailing from Demarara to Barbados.

Commander Charles Gordon replaced Ayscough in 1806.

Fate
On 20 March 1807 the French privateers Vengeance (12 guns) and Friponne (5 guns) captured Saint Lucia off Guadeloupe. Before she struck her colours, Saint Lucia had suffered seven men dead and eight wounded. Gordon had initiated the action but his first broadside disabled three of his cannonades when the recoil pulled their breaching bolts out of the timbers. The fourth broadside similarly disabled a fourth cannonade. He turned to use his other broadside, but lost two more cannonades when their recoil caved in the bulwarks. Saint Lucia fought on for two more hours but then surrendered when the French approached with the intention of boarding her. Her subsequent fate is unknown.

Notes, citations, and references
Notes

Citations

References
 
 
Hepper, David J. (1994) British Warship Losses in the Age of Sail, 1650-1859. (Rotherfield: Jean Boudriot). 
Norie, J. W. (1842) The naval gazetteer, biographer and chronologist; containing a history of the late wars from ... 1793 to ... 1801; and from ... 1803 to 1815, and continued, as to the biographical part to the present time. (London, C. Wilson).
 

 

Brigs of the Royal Navy
1790 ships
Captured ships
Ships of the French Navy